Andrei Martin (born 27 June 1974) is a Moldovan football manager and former player who is currently the manager of Dacia Buiucani.

Career
He has played in the Moldovan National Division from the early 1990s until 2011, for multiple clubs, most notably Dacia Chișinău.

Previously he worked as the assistant manager of Dorinel Munteanu at Romanian club Astra Giurgiu (March–April 2015), Azeri club FK Qäbälä (June–December 2014) and Russian clubs Kuban Krasnodar (July–October 2013), and Mordovia Saransk (January–June 2013).

Andrei Martin holds a UEFA PRO Manager Licence.

He has been an assistant coach for the Moldova national team on three occasions.

References

External links
 
 
 

1974 births
Living people
Footballers from Chișinău
Moldovan footballers
Moldovan expatriate footballers
Expatriate footballers in Kazakhstan
Moldovan expatriate sportspeople in Kazakhstan
Kazakhstan Premier League players
Moldovan Super Liga players
FC Agro-Goliador Chișinău players
FC Dacia Chișinău players
FC Zhetysu players
FC Sfîntul Gheorghe players
Association football defenders
Association football midfielders
Moldovan football managers
Moldovan Super Liga managers
FC Sfîntul Gheorghe managers